The 1996 Japan Open Tennis Championships included this tournament in men's singles.  Jim Courier was the defending champion but did not compete that year.

Pete Sampras won in the final 6–4, 7–5 against Richey Reneberg.

Seeds
The top eight seeds received a bye to the second round.

  Pete Sampras (champion)
  Michael Chang (quarterfinals)
  Thomas Enqvist (quarterfinals)
  Wayne Ferreira (third round)
  Mark Woodforde (semifinals)
  Richard Krajicek (quarterfinals)
  Jan Siemerink (second round)
  Todd Woodbridge (third round)
  Byron Black (first round)
  Guy Forget (quarterfinals)
  David Prinosil (third round)
  Jakob Hlasek (second round)
  Greg Rusedski (third round)
  Bernd Karbacher (first round)
  Tim Henman (first round)
  Kenneth Carlsen (second round)

Draw

Finals

Top half

Section 1

Section 2

Bottom half

Section 3

Section 4

References
 1996 Japan Open Tennis Championships Draw

Singles